Al-Manshiyya, also known as Khirbat Manshiyya, was a Palestinian Arab village in the Tulkarm Subdistrict. It was depopulated during the 1947–48 Civil War in Mandatory Palestine on April 15, 1948, under Operation Coastal Clearing. It was located 12.5 km northwest of Tulkarm.

History
The villagers traced their origin to  Abasan, in the Gaza district.

British Mandate era
In the 1922 census of Palestine conducted by the British Mandate authorities, Manshiyeh had a population of 94  Muslims, while in the 1931 census the village was counted under Attil, together with Jalama and Zalafa. 

Ein ha-Horesh and  Giv'at Chayirn were founded in 1931 and 1932 on what traditionally had been village land. 

In the 1945 statistics, it had a population of 260 Muslims,   with a total of 16,770 dunums  of land.  Of this, Arabs used 1 dunam for citrus and bananas, 12 were plantations and irrigated land, 12,485 were for cereals, while  total of 437 dunams were classified as  “non-cultivable” areas.

1948, aftermath
In December 1947, villagers from Al-Manshiyya approached Givat Haim to conclude a local non-belligerent agreement.

In April 1948,  Haganah had established policy of "cleaning out" the local Arabs from the coastal area. The villagers of Al-Manshiyya evacuated eastwards, apparently after "reaching an agreement with Haganah representatives that Jewish settlements would safeguard their property and allow them to return after the war."

However, on 12 April 1948,  even before the village was evacuated, the "Committee for new settlements" had destined Al-Manshiyya to be the location of a new, Jewish settlement.

In 1951 Ahituv was founded on the land of Al-Manshiyya.

In 1992 the village remains were described:  "A paved street bisects the site. The Israeli settlement of Giv'at Chayyim lies on both sides of this street, and there is a large cow barn at the southern end of it. Cactuses grow near the village entrance. Stones from the destroyed village houses are used as boundaries between flower beds, especially those lying along the street. Cotton, pistachios, and fruits are grown on the surrounding land."

References

Bibliography

External links
Welcome To al-Manshiyya, Palestine Remembered
Khirbet al-Manshiyya, Zochrot
Survey of Western Palestine, Map 11:    IAA, Wikimedia commons

Arab villages depopulated during the 1948 Arab–Israeli War
District of Tulkarm